"I'm Not Feeling It Anymore" is a song by Van Morrison from the album Hymns to the Silence. It was released as a promotional CD single in the United States and Canada, with the single edit being about 2 minutes shorter than the album version, the latter serving also as the B-side. The same year, singer Tom Jones recorded a cover of the song, releasing it as a single as well, after a fairly successful duet version of another Van Morrison song, "Carrying a Torch", featuring Morrison himself. The song charted at No. 72 in Spain.

References

1991 songs
Van Morrison songs
Tom Jones (singer) songs